Wuillians Martin Vasquez (born  July 23, 1983) is a Venezuelan-Nicaraguan professional baseball infielder.

Career
Vasquez played in the New York Yankees minor league system from 2001 to 2004, playing with the GCL Yankees, Tampa Yankees, Staten Island Yankees, and Battle Creek Yankees. In the minor leagues, he batted .229/.318/.342. 

He has played for the San Marino Baseball Club in the Italian Baseball League since 2008. He also played for HCAW in Honkbal Hoofdklasse in 2010. He played for Venezuela in the 2011 Baseball World Cup and the 2011 Pan American Games.

Vasquez started playing in the Nicaraguan Professional Baseball League during the 2011–12 season. During the 2013–14 season, playing for the Tigres de Chinandega, he led the league in hitting with a .351 average. He played for Nicaragua in their unsuccessful attempt to qualify for the World Baseball Classic. However, he had only one hit in 16 at-bats.

During the 2016–17 season, playing for the Gigantes de Rivas of the Nicaraguan Winter League, he led the league in hitting (.407), home runs (11), and RBIs (55). He also tied the league record for doubles (18) and slugging (.695), and set the league record for on-base percentage (.524). He was selected Most Valuable Player.

In 2019, he was selected for Nicaragua national baseball team at the 2019 Pan American Games Qualifier, and later played at the 2019 Pan American Games. He was later selected to Team Nicaragua at the 2021 World Baseball Classic Qualifier.

References

External links

1983 births
Living people
Baseball infielders
Baseball players at the 2011 Pan American Games
Baseball players at the 2019 Pan American Games
Battle Creek Yankees players
Caribes de Anzoátegui players
Gulf Coast Yankees players
HCAW players
Pan American Games bronze medalists for Nicaragua
Pan American Games medalists in baseball
People from Acarigua
Venezuelan expatriate baseball players in Italy
Venezuelan expatriate baseball players in the United States
Venezuelan expatriate baseball players in San Marino
Venezuelan expatriate sportspeople in the Netherlands
Staten Island Yankees players
T & A San Marino players
Tampa Yankees players
Medalists at the 2019 Pan American Games